Exelastis is a genus of plume moths in the family Pterophoridae. There are more than 20 described species in Exelastis.

Species
These 21 species belong to the genus Exelastis:

 Exelastis atomosa (Walsingham, 1885)
 Exelastis boireaui Bigot, 1992
 Exelastis caroli Gielis, 2008
 Exelastis crepuscularis Meyrick, 1909
 Exelastis crudipennis (Meyrick, 1932)
 Exelastis dowi Matthews & Landry, 2008
 Exelastis ebalensis (Rebel, 1907)
 Exelastis hulstaerti Gielis, 2011
 Exelastis luqueti Gibeaux, 1994
 Exelastis montischristi (Walsingham, 1897)
 Exelastis pavidus (Meyrick, 1908)
 Exelastis phlyctaenias (Meyrick, 1911)
 Exelastis pilum Gielis, 2009
 Exelastis pumilio (Zeller, 1873)
 Exelastis rhynchosiae (Dyar, 1898)
 Exelastis robinsoni Gibeaux, 1994
 Exelastis sarcochroa (Meyrick, 1932)
 Exelastis tenax (Meyrick, 1913)
 Exelastis viettei Gibeaux, 1994
 Exelastis vuattouxi Bigot, 1970

References

Former species
Exelastis bergeri Bigot, 1969

Exelastini
Moth genera